The Papar were a historic Celtic Christian group.

Papar may also refer to:
 Papadum, or papar, an Indian flatbread
 Papar, Malaysia, a town in Sabah, Malaysia
 Papar District
 Papar (federal constituency)
 Papar railway station (Malaysia)
 Papar River, a river in Sabah, Malaysia
 Papar language, a language of Malaysia
 Papar railway station (Indonesia), a train station on Java, Indonesia
 Papar, Iran, a village in Iran